The Percé station is a closed Via Rail station in Percé, Quebec, Canada. It served the Montreal-Gaspé train until service east of Matapédia station was suspended in 2013. It is located on rue L'Anse à Beaufils 11 km (6.8 mi) southwest of the village, and was staffed with wheelchair-accessibility.

References

External links

Via Rail stations in Quebec
Railway stations in Gaspésie–Îles-de-la-Madeleine
Disused railway stations in Canada